John Martin McDonough (26 July 1879 – 23 February 1955) was an Australian rules footballer who played for the South Melbourne Football Club and Fitzroy Football Club in the Victorian Football League (VFL).

Football
McDonough was a forward and started his brief VFL career in 1902 at South Melbourne. After managing 21 games over two seasons he crossed to Fitzroy where he enjoyed team success, playing in two premiership sides.

Notes

References
 South Melbourne Team, Melbourne Punch, (Thursday, 4 June 1903), p.16.

External links

 

1879 births
1955 deaths
Fitzroy Football Club players
Fitzroy Football Club Premiership players
Sydney Swans players
Australian rules footballers from Victoria (Australia)
Two-time VFL/AFL Premiership players